The Maryland Terrapins football team was founded in 1892 to represent the University of Maryland in intercollegiate competition and has participated in the sport all but one season since its inception. Over the course of the team's history, the Terrapins' performance has run the gamut from national championships to winless seasons.

During periods of both ascendancy and mediocrity, individual Maryland players of exceptional ability have received various accolades. In total, Terrapins have been named to an All-America team 58 times, an All-Atlantic Coast Conference team 196 times, an All-Big Ten Conference team 7 times, and an All-Southern Conference team 14 times. Of the All-America selections, twenty-three players received first-team honors a total of twenty-eight times. Eleven players were named consensus first-team All-Americans a total of twelve times, and five players were named first-team All-Americans by unanimous consensus.

Terrapins have won several nationally recognized individual awards, including the Chuck Bednarik Award, the Dick Butkus Award, the Lombardi Award, and the Outland Trophy, each of which recognizes the best player at a particular position in a given season. The College Football Hall of Fame has inducted six former Maryland players, and the Pro Football Hall of Fame has enshrined two. Four former Maryland head coaches have also been inducted into the College Football Hall of Fame. The University of Maryland Athletic Hall of Fame has inducted sixty-two former football lettermen and two former head coaches who were not alumni.

All-Americans
Each year, numerous publications and organizations release lists of All-America teams, hypothetical rosters of players considered the best in the nation at their respective positions. Some selecting organizations choose more than one roster of All-Americans, in which case they use the terms "first team", "second team", and "third team" as appropriate. Some selectors also award honorable mentions to outstanding players who did not make any of their teams.

The National Collegiate Athletic Association (NCAA), a college sports governing body, uses officially recognized All-America selectors to determine the "consensus" selections. These are based on a point system in which a player is awarded three points for every selector that names him to the first team, two points for the second team, and one point for the third team. The individual who receives the most points at his position is called a consensus All-American. Over time, the sources used to determine the consensus selections have changed, and since 2002, the NCAA has used these five selectors to determine consensus All-Americans: the Associated Press (AP), American Football Coaches Association (AFCA), Football Writers Association of America (FWAA), The Sporting News (TSN), and the Walter Camp Football Foundation (WCFF).

In 1923, end Bill Supplee was selected to the Associated Press second team, which made him the first Maryland player to be named an All-American. Guard Bob Ward became the first Terrapin named to a first team when he received that honor from AP and the Football Writers Association of America in 1950. The following year, Ward became Maryland's first consensus All-American when he was unanimously chosen by every NCAA-recognized selector. Five other Terrapins have earned consensus All-America honors: Jack Scarbath in 1952, Stan Jones in 1953, Bob Pellegrini in 1955, Randy White in 1974, and linebacker E. J. Henderson in 2001. Henderson was also named a consensus All-American in 2002, which made him the first, and thus far only, Maryland player to receive the honor twice.

All-conference honorees

Just as the media recognizes the nation's best players with All-America lists, individual athletic conferences honor their best players with "all-conference" selections. In 1921, Maryland joined the Southern Conference (SoCon). Thirteen years later, Norwood Sothoron became the first Terrapin named to an All-Southern Conference team. Maryland was a member of the league from 1921 to 1952, and twelve Terrapins received All-Southern Conference honors a total of fourteen times.

After the 1952 season, Maryland and six other schools left the Southern Conference to form the Atlantic Coast Conference (ACC). The following year, the conference honored its inaugural season's best players with an All-ACC team. In that initial class, five Terrapins were selected to the first team and two to the second team. From 1953 to 2013, Maryland players received first-team All-ACC honors a total of 134 times. Terrapins were named to All-ACC second or third teams an additional 62 times, although those teams were not published continuously and there was not always a third team. Since Maryland moved to the Big Ten Conference in 2014, five Terrapins have been named to All-Big Ten first teams, and two have earned second-team honors.

When the NCAA abolished the one-platoon system in 1965, the ACC began naming separate all-conference offensive and defensive teams. In 1974, Maryland won its first ACC championship since 1955, and a school record six Terrapins were named to the conference's first team. Maryland secured the title again in 1975 and 1976, and surpassed the previous mark when seven Terrapins were named first-team All-ACC for each of those seasons. The 2001 squad set a new benchmark when eight players made the first team, and the 2002 Terrapins equaled that feat.

In 2003, the Atlantic Coast Conference published the "ACC 50th Anniversary Football Team", a list of the league's fifty best players from its first half-century as chosen by a 120-member committee. Four former Terrapins were included on the list: Boomer Esiason, a Maryland quarterback from 1981 to 1983; Stan Jones, a tackle from 1951 to 1953; Bob Pellegrini, a guard from 1953 to 1955; and Randy White, a defensive tackle from 1972 to 1974.

All-Southern Conference honorees

Award recipients
Various organizations bestow awards recognizing the best player overall or at a specific position, and some of these annual awards are considered highly prestigious honors. All of the following individual awards bestowed upon Terrapins have gone to linemen and defensive players. In 1952, tackle Dick Modzelewski was awarded the Outland Trophy, for best interior lineman, and the Touchdown Club's Knute Rockne Award for best lineman. The following year, Stan Jones won the Knute Rockne Award. In 1955, the Touchdown Club bestowed its Walter Camp Memorial Trophy, for best player, and Knute Rockne Award, for best lineman, upon center Bob Pellegrini, who was also named the Lineman of the Year by United Press International (UPI). In 1974, Randy White won the Lombardi Award, for best lineman or linebacker; the Outland Trophy, for best interior lineman; and was named the UPI Lineman of the Year. In 2002, E. J. Henderson received the Chuck Bednarik Award, for best linebacker, and the Dick Butkus Award for best lineman or linebacker.

By comparison, Maryland's offensive players and backs have fared better with conference accolades. Quarterback Jack Scarbath was named the 1952 Southern Conference Player of the Year, and Bernie Faloney received ACC Player of the Year honors the following season. In 2001, running back Bruce Perry was named the ACC Offensive Player of the Year.

No Terrapin has ever won the Heisman Trophy, but several have received votes. In 1952, quarterback Jack Scarbath was the Heisman runner-up, and his successor, Bernie Faloney, finished fourth in the voting the following year. Center Bob Pellegrini finished sixth in 1955, end Gary Collins finished eighth in 1961, defensive tackle Randy White finished ninth in 1973, and quarterback Boomer Esiason finished tenth in 1983.

After his national championship-winning season in 1953, Jim Tatum received Coach of the Year honors from the AFCA and the FWAA. He was also named coach of the year by the Southern Conference in 1951 and the Atlantic Coast Conference in 1953 and 1955. The Sporting News named Jerry Claiborne the nation's top coach in 1974, and in 1982, his successor, Bobby Ross, received that distinction from the Touchdown Club. For his first-year turnaround of a team that had one winning season in the previous decade, Ralph Friedgen received national Coach of the Year plaudits from at least eight organizations.

Players

Coaches

Hall of Fame inductees

The College Football Hall of Fame has commemorated many of the sport's most outstanding and most innovative personalities. Among them are six former Maryland players and four former Maryland head coaches. In 1980, Bob Ward became the first Maryland player in the College Football Hall of Fame. He also served as the team's head coach in 1967 and 1968, but without much success. In 1983, the Hall of Fame inducted former quarterback Jack Scarbath, who led Maryland to a school-record 22-game winning streak and an upset victory over first-ranked Tennessee in the 1952 "Game of the Century". That season, Scarbath was named a first-team All-American by unanimous consensus and finished as the runner-up in the Heisman Trophy vote. Tackle Dick Modzelewski, inducted in 1993, won the 1952 Outland Trophy as the nation's best lineman and later had a 14-year career in the National Football League (NFL). Center Bob Pellegrini was inducted in 1996. Named the ACC's best blocker in 1955, Pellegrini was a starter on the 1953 national championship team, the AP Poll eighth-ranked 1954 team, and the third-ranked 1955 team.

Two former Maryland players have been inducted into both the College Football Hall of Fame and the Pro Football Hall of Fame for accomplishments during their professional playing careers. Tackle Stan Jones was named a unanimous consensus All-American after the 1953 national championship campaign. After graduation, he embarked upon a 13-year NFL career that included seven consecutive Pro Bowls. Jones was inducted into the Pro Football Hall of Fame in 1991 and the College Football Hall of Fame in 2000. Defensive tackle Randy White was twice named to the All-American first team, the second time by unanimous consensus in 1974. That season, White helped Maryland to an ACC championship and received numerous lineman and player of the year accolades. During his 14-year NFL career, White played in three Super Bowls, six National Football Conference championships, and missed only one game.

In 1968, Clark Shaughnessy became the first Maryland coach inducted into the College Football Hall of Fame. Shaughnessy pioneered the pass-oriented variation of the T-formation that largely replaced the single-wing, and he coached Maryland for two non-consecutive seasons in the 1940s. Shaughnessy mentored Terrapins quarterback and future head coach Tommy Mont, the third-ranked passer in the nation in 1942. Bear Bryant, inducted in 1986, is best known for leading Alabama to six national championships, but his first head coaching job came at Maryland in 1945. Bryant's team finished the season 6–2–1, and he later said that the Maryland position was the one "that launched me to whatever I've accomplished". Jim Tatum, inducted in 1984, served as Maryland's head coach from 1947 to 1955, and his teams secured two national championships, three conference championships, and five bowl game appearances. Tatum compiled a 73–15–4 record without a losing season, and he remains Maryland's all-time winningest coach of the modern era. When Jerry Claiborne arrived in 1972, Maryland had suffered through seven straight losing seasons. In his second year, Claiborne engineered a turnaround, and from 1973 to 1978, he led Maryland to six consecutive bowl games and three consecutive ACC championships. Claiborne was inducted into the College Football Hall of Fame in 1999.

Since 1982, the University of Maryland Athletic Hall of Fame has enshrined some of the school's greatest athletes. Inductees have included sixty-two football players, three of whom also served as head coach, and two head football coaches who were not alumni of the university. Eleven football lettermen were in the inaugural class, including Harry Clifton "Curley" Byrd, who was a multi-sport athlete, 24-year football coach, athletic director, professor, university president, and politician. Other football players in the 1982 class included Bosey Berger, a Major League Baseball player; Burton Shipley, Maryland's first basketball coach; and Fred Linkous, a Lacrosse Hall of Famer.

College Football Hall of Fame

University of Maryland Athletic Hall of Fame

References:Football Standout Castro Named to 2009 Hall of Fame Class , University of Maryland, May 29, 2009, retrieved June 17, 2009.

Glossary

References

 
Maryland Terrapins
Maryland Terrapins football honorees